River Claire may refer to:
River Claire (Dominica)
River Claire (Grenada)